In astronomy, a co-orbital configuration is a configuration of two or more astronomical objects (such as asteroids, moons, or planets) orbiting at the same, or very similar, distance from their primary, i.e. they are in a 1:1 mean-motion resonance. (or 1:−1 if orbiting in opposite directions).

There are several classes of co-orbital objects, depending on their point of libration. Another class is the horseshoe orbit, in which objects librate around 180° from the larger body. Objects librating around 0° are called quasi-satellites.

An exchange orbit occurs when two co-orbital objects are of similar masses and thus exert a non-negligible influence on each other. The objects can exchange semi-major axes or eccentricities when they approach each other.

Parameters
Orbital parameters that are used to describe the relation of co-orbital objects are the longitude of the periapsis difference and the mean longitude difference. The longitude of the periapsis is the sum of the mean longitude and the mean anomaly  and the mean longitude is the sum of the longitude of the ascending node and the argument of periapsis .

Trojans

The best known example are the asteroids that orbit ahead of or behind Jupiter around the Sun. Trojan objects do not orbit exactly at one of either Lagrangian points, but do remain relatively close to it, appearing to slowly orbit it. In technical terms, they librate around  = (±60°, ±60°). The point around which they librate is the same, irrespective of their mass or orbital eccentricity.

Trojan minor planets 

There are several thousand known trojan minor planets orbiting the Sun. Most of these orbit near Jupiter's Lagrangian points, the traditional Jupiter trojans. , there are also 13 Neptune trojans, 7 Mars trojans, 2 Uranus trojans ( and ) and 2 Earth trojans ( and (614689) 2020 XL5 ) known to exist. As yet no Saturnian trojans have been observed.

Trojan moons
The Saturnian system contains two sets of trojan moons. Both Tethys and Dione have two trojan moons each, Telesto and Calypso in Tethys's  and  respectively, and Helene and Polydeuces in Dione's  and  respectively.

Polydeuces is noticeable for its wide libration: it wanders as far as ±30° from its Lagrangian point and ±2% from its mean orbital radius, along a tadpole orbit in 790 days (288 times its orbital period around Saturn, the same as Dione's).

Trojan planets 
A pair of co-orbital exoplanets was proposed to be orbiting the star Kepler-223, but this was later retracted.

The possibility of a trojan planet to Kepler-91b was studied but the conclusion was that the transit-signal was a false-positive.

One possibility for the habitable zone is a trojan planet of a giant planet close to its star.

Formation of the Earth–Moon system 
According to the giant impact hypothesis, the Moon formed after a collision between two co-orbital objects: Theia, thought to have had about 10% of the mass of Earth (about as massive as Mars), and the proto-Earth. Their orbits were perturbed by other planets, bringing Theia out of its trojan position and causing the collision.

Horseshoe orbits

Objects in a horseshoe orbit librate around 180° from the primary.

Co-orbital moons

The Saturnian moons Janus and Epimetheus share their orbits, the difference in semi-major axes being less than either's mean diameter. This means the moon with the smaller semi-major axis will slowly catch up with the other. As it does this, the moons gravitationally tug at each other, increasing the semi-major axis of the moon that has caught up and decreasing that of the other. This reverses their relative positions proportionally to their masses and causes this process to begin anew with the moons' roles reversed. In other words, they effectively swap orbits, ultimately oscillating both about their mass-weighted mean orbit.

Earth co-orbital asteroids
A small number of asteroids have been found which are co-orbital with Earth. The first of these to be discovered, asteroid 3753 Cruithne, orbits the Sun with a period slightly less than one Earth year, resulting in an orbit that (from the point of view of Earth) appears as a bean-shaped orbit centered on a position ahead of the position of Earth. This orbit slowly moves further ahead of Earth's orbital position. When Cruithne's orbit moves to a position where it trails Earth's position, rather than leading it, the gravitational effect of Earth increases the orbital period, and hence the orbit then begins to lag, returning to the original location. The full cycle from leading to trailing Earth takes 770 years, leading to a horseshoe-shaped movement with respect to Earth.

More resonant near-Earth objects (NEOs) have since been discovered.

Hungaria asteroids were found to be one of the possible sources for co-orbital objects of the Earth with a lifetime up to ~58 kyrs.

Quasi-satellite

Quasi-satellites are co-orbital objects that librate around 0° from the primary. Low-eccentricity quasi-satellite orbits are highly unstable, but for moderate to high eccentricities such orbits can be stable. From a co-rotating perspective the quasi-satellite appears to orbit the primary like a retrograde satellite, although at distances so large that it is not gravitationally bound to it. Two examples of quasi-satellites of the Earth are 
and 469219 Kamoʻoalewa.

Exchange orbits
In addition to swapping semi-major axes like Saturn's moons Epimetheus and Janus, another possibility is to share the same axis, but swap eccentricities instead.

See also

 Double planet
 Kordylewski cloud
 Chinese Space Station Telescope

References

External links

QuickTime animation of co-orbital motion from Murray and Dermott
Cassini Observes the Orbital Dance of Epimetheus and Janus The Planetary Society
A Search for Trojan Planets Web page of group of astronomers searching for extrasolar trojan planets at Appalachian State University